Bachia geralista is a species of lizard in the family Gymnophthalmidae. It is endemic to Brazil.

References

Bachia
Reptiles described in 2013
Reptiles of Brazil
Endemic fauna of Brazil
Taxa named by Mauro Teixeira Jr.
Taxa named by Renato Recoder
Taxa named by Augustín Camacho Guerrero
Taxa named by Marco Aurélio de Sena
Taxa named by Carlos Arturo Navas Iannini
Taxa named by Miguel Trefaut Rodrigues